The intermembral index is a ratio used to compare limb proportions, expressed as a percentage. It is equal to the length of forelimbs (humerus plus radius) divided by the length of the hind limbs (femur plus tibia) multiplied by 100, otherwise written mathematically as:

The intermembral index is used frequently in primatology, since it helps predict primate locomotor patterns. For scores lower than 100, the forelimbs are shorter than the hind limbs, which is common in leaping primates and bipedal hominids.  Quadrupedal primates tend to have scores around 100, while brachiating primates have scores significantly higher than 100. This information can also be used to predict locomotion patterns for extinct primates in cases where forelimb and hind limb fossils have been found.

References

Primate anatomy